St Francis Church, Salisbury is an evangelical, charismatic, Church of England parish church in Salisbury, Wiltshire, England. A member of the New Wine Network of churches, and is located north of Salisbury, on the A345 Castle Road. About two hundred people attend its main services.

Main services
St Francis is a church for all age-groups and maintains a variety of service styles to meet people's needs. These are:

 09:30	Morning Worship		4th Sunday in the month
 09:30	Holy Communion		1st, 2nd, 3rd, and 5th Sundays
 11:00	Informal Worship	Every Sunday

The 9:30 am Sunday service is a traditional Sunday service with a mixture of traditional hymns & modern songs. The 11:00am 'Informal worship service' is a more family friendly time for worship and aims to be relaxed, reverent and fun. Music is led by a worship band with modern worship songs. Informal Communion is included on the fourth Sunday of the month. Children spend the first fifteen minutes in church before attending group activities.

Key Activities
As well as Sunday services each week, the church members participate in a selection of mid-week activities, which include the Alpha Course, house groups and children's and youth activities. Church members actively support  the bridge project. The church also supports a school and missionaries in the Sudan.

History of St Francis church
The church was founded in 1930 to serve the north of the city. Work began in 1930, with the consent of the vicars of Stratford-sub-Castle and St Mark's. With much voluntary help, a temporary wooden church was built on the eastern side of Stratford Road and dedicated in November 1930. In 1937 a new district was established, partly from the parish of Stratford-sub-Castle and partly from that of St Mark's, and a vicar was installed. In the same year a building committee was formed and a new site at the junction of Beatrice Road and Castle Road was purchased. Building work began in 1938, the foundation stone was laid in January 1939 and the church was consecrated in 1940.

The church building is in a 20th-century style with a wide nave with passage aisles and an apsidal Lady Chapel behind the sanctuary, instead of a chancel. The building was designed by the architect Robert Potter. It is structurally concrete with brick cladding and infill, and the church has artificial stone surrounds to the doors and windows. The cavity walls are faced with variegated red bricks and the dressings are of reconstituted stone. The roofs are of reinforced concrete covered with asphalt. The church is a Grade II listed building.

The Wiltshire volume of Nikolaus Pevsner's Buildings of England includes a short entry on the church: 

In the 21st century the church has had a £450,000 renovation to bring the building up to modern standards. One tenth of the renovation funds raised (£45,000) were given away to build a secondary school in Juba in South Sudan.

The parish registers for christenings from 1930 and marriages from 1940, other than those in current use, are held in the Wiltshire and Swindon History Centre.

Senior leadership and staff
Vicar: Jean de Garis.
Curate: Mary Terry

References

Wiltshire community history, accessed March 2009
Personal communications from St. Francis's Church PCC members.
St Francis Church website  Accessed March 2009.

External links
 St Francis Church website

Salisbury
Salisbury
Francis